Harris Flanagin (November 3, 1817October 23, 1874) was an American politician and lawyer who served as the 7th governor of Arkansas from 1862 to 1864, and in exile from 1864 to 1865. Prior to this he was a Confederate States Army officer who commanded infantry in the Western Theater of the American Civil War.

Early life and education 
Flanagin was born in Roadstown, New Jersey, to James, a farmer and cabinetmaker, and Mary (née Harris) Flanagin. He was educated at a Quaker school in New Jersey and then went on to teach at Clermont Seminary in Frankford (present-day Philadelphia). Soon after he moved to Illinois, where he again tried teaching and while at this work studied law. In 1838 Flanagin moved to Arkansas, settling first at Pine Bluff, then Little Rock, then Clark County in 1839, and Arkadelphia in 1842. He served in the Arkansas House of Representatives from 1842 to 1844 and the Arkansas Senate from 1848 to 1850. He was married on July 3, 1851, to Miss Martha Eliza Nash of Lafayette County. During the American Civil War Flanagin was promoted to colonel, commanding the 2d Arkansas Mounted Rifles.

Governor of Arkansas 
In 1862, Flanagin was elected governor of Arkansas and resigned from the Army to take office. His administration dealt primarily with war related measures and maintaining order and continuing government while undergoing an invasion. The government was faced with shortages of critical items, rising prices, care of fallen soldier's families, and related problems. During the American Civil War, the state government was forced to suspend the collection of taxes and financed the war with paper "war bonds". When on September 10, 1863, the capital of Little Rock fell to Union forces and Arkansas’s state government fled the city, he seized as many government documents as he could and reestablished the capitol at Washington, Arkansas. While governor Flanagin remained in Confederate controlled southwest Arkansas, a Union administration under provisional governor Isaac Murphy was inaugurated April 18, 1864, in the Arkansas State House at Little Rock.

Later life and death 
After the American Civil War, Flanagin returned the state archives and resumed his law practice in Arkadelphia. He died and is buried at Rose Hill Cemetery, Arkadelphia.

Electoral history

See also 
 List of Freemasons
 List of governors of Arkansas
 List of people from New Jersey

Notes

References

External links 

Harris Flanagin at The Political Graveyard

1817 births
1874 deaths
19th-century American educators
19th-century American lawyers
19th-century American politicians
19th-century Baptists
19th-century Presbyterians
American Freemasons
American lawyers admitted to the practice of law by reading law
American militia officers
American people of Irish descent
Arkansas Democrats
Arkansas Independents
Arkansas lawyers
Arkansas Whigs
Baptists from New Jersey
Burials in Arkansas
Colonels (military rank)
Confederate States Army officers
Confederate States of America state governors
Democratic Party governors of Arkansas
Educators from Philadelphia
Exiled politicians
Governors of Arkansas
Members of the Arkansas House of Representatives
Military personnel from Arkansas
Northern-born Confederates
People from Cumberland County, New Jersey
People of Arkansas in the American Civil War
People of the Brooks–Baxter War
Presbyterians from Arkansas
Recipients of American presidential pardons
Schoolteachers from Illinois
Schoolteachers from Pennsylvania